Archibald Yell (August 9, 1797 – February 23, 1847) was an American politician and lawyer who served as the U.S. representative from Arkansas from 1836 to 1839, and 1845 to 1846. He was the second governor of Arkansas, serving from 1840 to 1844. Yell was killed in action at the Battle of Buena Vista on February 23, 1847.

Early life
Yell was likely born in Kentucky or Tennessee, although his headstone lists North Carolina as his birthplace. His family first settled in Jefferson County in the eastern part of the state, then moved to Rutherford in Middle Tennessee, and finally settled in Bedford County to the south. As a youth, Yell participated in the Creek War, serving in 1813 and early 1814 under General Andrew Jackson. In 1814 and 1815, during the War of 1812, he served with Jackson in Louisiana, including in the Battle of New Orleans. He returned to Tennessee, and read law as a legal apprentice. He was admitted to the bar in Fayetteville, Tennessee. In 1818, he joined Jackson's army during the First Seminole War in Florida. He was active in freemasonry, and was the Grand Master of the Tennessee Lodge in 1830. 

By 1840, Yell owned 800 acres of land and 8 slaves.

Political career

Active in the Democratic Party, Yell moved to the Arkansas Territory in 1831 to head the federal land office in Little Rock. The federal government offered him the governorship of the Florida Territory the following year, but he declined. On March 21, 1832, Yell was appointed adjutant general of the Arkansas Territory with the rank of Colonel in place of Colonel Whorton Rector who had resigned. His time as adjutant general was apparently cut short by malaria."   Yell left Arkansas for a time to recoup back home in Tennessee, but by 1835, returned to Arkansas, having been appointed as a Territorial judge. He was a strong supporter and personal friend of President James K. Polk. Just prior to taking office in 1845, Polk sent Yell to Texas to advocate for its annexation to the union.  He is reported to have single-handedly retrieved a criminal from a local saloon and physically brought him to his court.

Yell was elected to the United States House of Representatives in 1836, after Arkansas was admitted to the Union. He served one term, from December 5, 1836, to March 3, 1839. While in Washington, he was a strong supporter of Texan statehood and favored a stronger military. Around this time that he formed the first Masonic lodge in Arkansas at Fayetteville.

In 1840, Yell was elected Governor of Arkansas. He focused on internal improvements, as infrastructure was needed to benefit planters and farmers. He also worked to better control banks and supported public education. Yell resigned his post as governor to run again for Congress in 1844 at age 47, and won the seat. He is reported to have been the consummate campaigner. At one stop during the campaign, he is said to have won a shooting match, donated meat to the poor, and bought a jug of whiskey for the crowd.

Mexican War
Soon after he took his seat in Congress, the Mexican War began. Yell returned to Arkansas and formed the Arkansas Mounted Infantry Regiment. Several of his men later achieved notability in Arkansas, including the future governor John Selden Roane, and future Confederate generals Albert Pike, Solon Borland, and James Fleming Fagan. His cavalry compiled a record of insubordination.  General John E. Wool, commander of the Arkansas mounted volunteers, said they were, "wholly without instruction, and Colonel Yell is determined to leave (them) in that condition."  Yell, he continued, had a "total ignorance of his duties as Colonel." During the Mexican War, he was brevetted a brigadier general of United States Volunteers.

Death
On February 23, 1847, Yell was killed in action at the Battle of Buena Vista at age 49. He was originally buried on the battlefield in Mexico. His body was removed and returned to Arkansas for burial at Waxhaws Cemetery in Fayetteville. When Evergreen Cemetery was established in the city, the Freemasons arranged for his body to be relocated and reinterred in the Masonic section of that cemetery.

Personal life
Yell met Mary Scott in Bedford County, Tennessee, where they were neighbors. They married in 1821 after he had started to establish his law practice. She had one daughter, Mary, who was born January 5, 1823. Mary Scott Yell died from complications following their daughter's birth. A few years later in 1828, he married Nancy Moore of Danville, Kentucky. They had four children before her death. He later married Maria (McIlvaine) Ficklin, a widow. They had no children. Maria died on October 15, 1838, while he was serving in Congress. His nephew James Yell became Major-General of the Arkansas Militia during the American Civil War.

Legacy
Yell County and Yellville, Arkansas, are named after him. An antebellum militia company from Helena, known as the "Yell Rifles", was also named after him.

See also
 List of Arkansas adjutants general
 List of Freemasons
 List of governors of Arkansas

References

External links

 
 Archibald Yell at the National Governors Association
 Archibald Yell at The Political Graveyard
 

1797 births
1847 deaths
Adjutants General of Arkansas
American lawyers admitted to the practice of law by reading law
American military personnel killed in the Mexican–American War
American military personnel of the Indian Wars
American militia officers
American militiamen in the War of 1812
American planters
American slave owners
Arkansas lawyers
Burials in Arkansas
Deaths in Mexico
Democratic Party members of the United States House of Representatives from Arkansas
Democratic Party governors of Arkansas
Grand Masters of the Grand Lodge of Tennessee
Jacksonian members of the United States House of Representatives from Arkansas
Members of the Tennessee House of Representatives
Place of birth unknown
United States Army generals